The Love Pier is a pier along Love River in Yancheng District, Kaohsiung, Taiwan.

History
The pier area used to be the No. 12 dock of the Republic of China Armed Forces.

Features

The pier is famous for its double sail design. It also houses the South District Police Department movie set building, made for the Taiwanese series Black and White.

Transportation
The pier is accessible within walking distance East from Yanchengpu Station of Kaohsiung MRT.

Popular culture
 Black and White
 Hi My Sweetheart

See also
 List of tourist attractions in Taiwan

References

Piers in Kaohsiung